Isaac White may refer to:
 Isaac White (militia colonel), colonel in the Illinois militia
 Isaac D. White, U.S. Army general
 Isaac White (basketball), Australian basketball player